Ten Easy Pieces is the ninth album by American singer-songwriter Jimmy Webb, released in October 1996 by Guardian Records. The album consists of new arrangements of some of Webb's most popular songs.

Critical reception
In his review for AllMusic, Bruce Eder called Ten Easy Pieces "the best and most accessible of all Webb's albums". Eder continued:

The AllMusic website gave the album four and a half out of five stars.

Track listing

Personnel

Music
 Jimmy Webb – vocals, piano, keyboards, Hammond organ, liner notes
 Dean Parks – guitar on "Wichita Lineman"
 Fred Mollin – autoharp, acoustic guitar on "If These Walls Could Speak"; backing vocals on "All I Know"
 Steve Smith – pedal steel
 Lesley Young – oboe
 Paul Widner – cello
 Steven MacKinnon – accordion on "Galveston"
 Pat Perez – soprano saxophone on "All I Know"
 Oliver Schroer – fiddle on "If These Walls Could Speak"
 Audrey King – cello
 David Hetherington – cello
 Matthew McCauley – string arrangements, backing vocals on "All I Know"
 Michael McDonald – backing vocals
 Shawn Colvin – backing vocals on "Didn't We"
 Susan Webb – backing vocals on "If These Walls Could Speak"
 Marc Cohn – backing vocals on "If These Walls Could Speak"

Production
 Fred Mollin – producer
 Jay Landers – executive producer  
 Glen Marchese – engineer  
 Bill Harwell – engineer  
 Brian Nevin – engineer  
 Jeff Wolpert – engineer, mixing  
 Greg Robertson – assistant engineer, mixing assistant  
 Denis Tougas – assistant engineer, mixing assistant  
 Greg Calbi – mastering  
 Robert Abriola – art direction  
 Carolyn Jones – photography

Charts

References

1996 albums
Jimmy Webb albums